Hamid Bernaoui (3 December 1937 – 6 May 2020) was a professional Algerian footballer who played as a forward.

Club career

Career statistics

Club

Honours
 Championnat National
 Winner: 1962-63

References

1937 births
2020 deaths
Algerian footballers
Footballers from Algiers
USM Alger players
Association football forwards
21st-century Algerian people